Davidoglu (from the Turkish surname suffix -oğlu, meaning "son of") is a Romanian surname. Notable people with the surname include:

Anton Davidoglu (1876–1958), Romanian mathematician
Cleante Davidoglu (1871–1947), Romanian general
Mihail Davidoglu (1910–1987), Romanian playwright

Romanian-language surnames
Surnames from given names